The Naassene Fragment is a fragmentary text that survives in no document except a quotation in the early third century encyclopedia of heresies by Hippolytus of Rome called  Refutation of All Heresies (5.7.2-9). It may be considered part of the New Testament apocryphal tradition. The Naassenes (from Hebrew nachash, snake) were a Gnostic Ophite sect. The fragmentary quotation is given by Hippolytus as expressing the fundamental ideas of the Naassene Ophites, and possibly of all Gnostics.

Text

G.R.S. Mead
Translation by G.R.S. Mead:
First [was there] Mind the Generative Law of All;
Second to the Firstborn was Liquid Chaos;  
Third Soul through toil received the Law. 
Wherefore, with a deer's form surrounding her, 
She labours at her task beneath Death's rule. 
Now, holding sway,  she sees the Light; 
And now, cast into piteous plight, she weeps; 
Now she weeps, and now rejoices; 
Now she weeps, and now is judged; 
Now is judged, and now she dieth; 
Now is born, with no way out for her; in misery 
She enters in her wandering the labyrinth of ills. And Jesus said: O Father, see! [Behold] the struggle still of ills on earth!
Far from Thy Breath away she wanders!
She seeks to flee the bitter Chaos,
And knows not how she shall pass through.
Wherefore, send me, O Father!
Seals in my hands, I will descend;
Through Æons universal will I make a Path;
Through Mysteries all I'll open up a Way!
And Forms of Gods will I display;
The secrets of the Holy Path I will hand on,
And call them Gnosis.

Adolf von Harnack
The following is Adolf von Harnack's paraphrase (SBA, 1902, pp. 542 sqq.):

The generating principle of the universe, the first in order, was 'reason'; but the second principle was the firstbom's emitted 'chaos'; and the third principle was received by the soul, which descends from both. Therefore, fashioned like a trembling deer, the soul wrests herself free from the grip of death (strengthening itself by such exertions). Now she wins the mastery and sees the light; now plunged into wo, she weeps; again, in the depths of evil, the unhappy one becomes ensnared in a maze. Then spake Jesus: "behold, O Father! this being, pursued by ills, roams astray upon earth, far from thy breath. It seeks to escape bitter chaos, and knows not whither to find escape. Therefore, send me, O Father, with the seals in my hand will I descend: all eons will I traverse, all mysteries reveal, and show the forms of the gods. I will deliver the secret of the holy way, and call it Gnosis."

Significance

Here, reason and chaos, the intelligent and the material world, stand opposed; and between them is the human soul, belonging to both spheres, yet striving toward the higher and the spiritual. The soul is unable to ascend by its own power; therefore, a heavenly being, concordant with the will of the supreme principle, descends into the human world and redeems the soul by showing it the way through the spheres which sunder it from the world divine. It is not mere thirst for knowledge that impels the Gnostics, but essentially a concern of salvation; because the Gnostic's salvation depends on the possession of the Gnosis respecting these things.

Like Gnosis at large, the Ophites teach the existence of a Supreme Being, standing infinitely high above the visible world; qualified as purely spiritual, the primal basis of all things, the starting-point of the cosmic process. His names are, Father of the Universe, First Man, the "Uncreated," the "Unspeakable," the "Unapproachable God." He is self-evolving, and thus becomes the source of all being. The first products of this spontaneous evolution still belong to the purely spiritual spheres. The Ophitic theology tends to separate this supreme God into an ever-increasing number of separate entities. In the aforesaid Hymn, only the Son is mentioned beside the Father; but a tetrad occurs among the Ophites of Irenaeus and the Naassenes; an entire decad among the Gnostici Barbelo; while the Nag Hammadi writings disclose a countless host of higher beings. The Supreme Being's mode of evolution is set forth, now as a generative, again as a psychologic process; and frequently the two ideas are combined. Some pagan mythology lies obviously at the root of the matter; which accounts also for their syzygial views; for, in part at least, the Ophites aimed to interpret the ancient myths as psychologic processes. Over against the Supreme Being stands chaos, the material principle. Yet there is not here a sharp dualism. In the Hymn, the phrase "the firstborn's emitted chaos" implies that it is derived from a higher being. In only very few instances is chaos an evil power, an active principle. It is not the existence of chaos which contradicts perfection; but rather the mixture of luminous parts with material elements. This mixture, in a word, is the great calamity, the loss that must be retrieved through redemption. How did this mixture come to pass? The Hymn designates the soul, the principle of this compound, as the common product of mind and chaos. Such is also the theory of the Perates and Sethians, mentioned by Hippolytus. These sects most nearly approach the dualistic scheme, yet the latter is not distinctly defined. In Justin, also, dualism is diminished.

Bibliography

 
 
 Hippolytus, Philosophumena, Book V: "Naasseni"
Gnostic Society Library: The Naassene Fragment
Attribution

Agrapha of Jesus and apocryphal fragments
Gnosticism